Longmuir is a surname. Notable people with the surname include:

Alan Longmuir (1948–2018), Scottish bass guitarist
Bill Longmuir (born 1953), British golfer
David Longmuir, head of the Scottish Football League
Derek Longmuir (born 1951), Scottish drummer
James Longmuir, Church of Scotland minister
John Longmuir (poet) (1803–1883), Scottish minister, antiquary, poet and lexicographer
John Longmuir (tenor), Scottish-born Australian tenor
Justin Longmuir (born 1981), Australian rules footballer
Troy Longmuir (born 1979), Australian rules footballer